God Put a Rainbow in the Sky is the second studio album by Swedish singer-songwriter Miss Li. It was released on 2 May 2007, and debuted at number 42 on the Swedish Albums Chart, while reaching its peak position of number 29, when it reentered the chart in July the same year.

Track listing
 "Let Her Go" - 2:19
 "All I Need Is You" - 1:51
 "I'm Glad I'm Not a Proud American" - 3:05
 "Don't Try to Fool Me" - 3:41
 "Autumn Cold" - 2:05
 "I'm Sorry, He's Mine" - 2:55
 "The Songs We Used to Sing" - 3:44
 "Kings & Queens" - 2:11
 "The Happy Sinner" - 4:58
 "A Song About Me and a Boy" - 6:49

References

2007 albums
Miss Li albums